Lucia Gubiková (born 11 February 1993) was a Slovak handball player for Mosonmagyaróvári KC SE and the Slovak national team. She previously played for IUVENTA Michalovce.

References

1993 births
Living people
Slovak female handball players
People from Michalovce
Sportspeople from the Košice Region